South Changjiang Road is a station on Shanghai Metro Line 3. It later became an interchange station after the opening of Line 18 on 30 December 2021.

Short-turn trains
Because northern Baoshan District is largely suburban, half of line 3 trains terminate early here.

Station Layout

References

Shanghai Metro stations in Baoshan District
Line 3, Shanghai Metro
Railway stations in China opened in 2006
Railway stations in Shanghai
Line 18, Shanghai Metro